Edibaldo Maldonado Rayas (born 27 April 1993) is a Mexican track and road cyclist, who currently rides for UCI Continental team . He competed in the individual pursuit at the 2014 UCI Track Cycling World Championships.

References

External links

1993 births
Living people
Mexican track cyclists
Mexican male cyclists
Place of birth missing (living people)
Cyclists at the 2011 Pan American Games
Cyclists at the 2019 Pan American Games
Pan American Games competitors for Mexico
20th-century Mexican people
21st-century Mexican people
Competitors at the 2018 Central American and Caribbean Games